The Herbert C. Young Community Center is the local community and recreation center in Cary, North Carolina. 

The center opened in 1991, and was the first such facility in the town. It was renamed in 2001 in honor of Herb Young, a 20-year volunteer and former Town Council member who also served on the Parks, Recreation & Cultural Resources Advisory Board member. The facility supports athletic programs and fitness classes among other events. The lower gymnasium can support large events, such as performing arts or other large special events.

Service and Amenities
 Coach Kay Yow Court Basketball Court
 Meeting rooms
 Kitchen for catering and classes
 Locker rooms
 Vending area

Sports
The Herbert C. Young Community Center is home to the Cary Invasion, a professional basketball team which play in the Tobacco Road Basketball League.

References

Buildings and structures in Cary, North Carolina
Buildings and structures in Wake County, North Carolina
Sports venues in North Carolina
1991 establishments in North Carolina
Sports venues completed in 1991